is a Japanese former baseball professional baseball player. He played for the Nippon Ham Fighters in the Pacific league.

References

1976 births
Living people
Baseball people from Saitama Prefecture
University of Tokyo alumni
Japanese baseball players
Nippon Professional Baseball pitchers
Nippon Ham Fighters players